The Tony Award for Best Conductor and Musical Director was awarded to acknowledge the contributions of conductors and musical directors in both musicals and operas. The award was first presented in 1948, and later discontinued after 1964.

Winners and nominees

1940s

1950s

1960s

Award records

Multiple wins
 2 Wins
 Franz Allers
 Lehman Engel
 Max Meth

Multiple nominations

 5 Nominations
 Lehman Engel

 3 Nominations
 Herbert Greene
 Milton Rosenstock

 2 Nominations
 Franz Allers
 Jay Blackston
 Pembroke Davenport
 Salvatore Dell'Isola
 Hal Hastings
 Elliot Lawrence

See also
 Drama Desk Award for Outstanding Orchestrations
 Tony Award for Best Orchestrations

External links
 Tony Awards Official site
 Tony Awards at Internet Broadway database Listing
 Tony Awards at broadwayworld.com

Tony Awards
Awards established in 1948
1948 establishments in the United States
1964 disestablishments in the United States
Awards disestablished in 1964